Field Day Festival was a music festival held at Giants Stadium in East Rutherford, New Jersey on June 7, 2003. Headlining bands were Radiohead and Beastie Boys. The festival was planned as a two-day event in Calverton, Long Island, New York. Due to conflicts with local police departments over providing security for the event, Suffolk County refused permission for the festival. It was relocated at the last minute to Giants Stadium and changed to a one-day event. The organizers issued refunds to original ticket holders and sold new tickets.

See also
Other festivals and conventions that suffered disastrous consequences due to poor organization and planning:
Fyre Festival, a 2017 music festival scheduled for a Bahamian island and promoted heavily by social media influencers. Although some attendees arrived at the island, the Fyre Festival organization was in a state of disarray and the festival never took place.  
Altamont Free Concert, 1969 festival near San Francisco where an attendee was killed in a clash with a member of the Hell's Angels working as security.
DashCon, 2014 Tumblr enthusiast convention where organizers tried to mollify disappointed attendees by offering them free time in a small ball pit.
TomorrowWorld, yearly festival outside Atlanta canceled after 2015 iteration ruined by bad weather.
Woodstock '99, 30th anniversary concert outside Rome, New York, that devolved into near-riot conditions.

References

2003 music festivals
Events in East Rutherford, New Jersey